Ormiston Primrose Football Club are a senior football club based in Ormiston, East Lothian, currently competing in the .

The club was founded in 1999 as an amalgamation of former East of Scotland League team Pencaitland and Junior team Ormiston Primrose.

Ormiston play their home matches at New Recreation Park, which was completed in 2018 (along with a new changing pavilion) as a replacement to the old Recreation Park which stood on adjacent land and closed a year earlier. In the intervening period, the club used the Hibernian Training Centre located a short distance to the north of Ormiston. An official partnership with professionals Hibernian had already been arranged in 2014 to strengthen the Edinburgh club's presence in the local area and give Ormiston some practical assistance.

History 
Pencaitland, from the nearby village of the same name, were originally founded in 1919. They won the Scottish Amateur Cup in 1984 and then joined the East of Scotland League in 1986, eventually gaining promotion and competing in the Premier Division for four seasons.

Ormiston Primrose were originally founded in the 1890s - they reached the final of the Scottish Junior Cup in 1989 and twice won the East of Scotland Junior Cup.

For a couple of years the club used the name Pencaitland & Ormiston but decided to shorten it to just Ormiston F.C. in 2003, although they retain strong links to Pencaitland. Meanwhile, Pencaitland AFC reformed as a separate amateur club, competing in the Lothian & Edinburgh Amateur Football Association (LEAFA).

Ahead of the 2022–23 season, the club changed their name to Ormiston Primrose.

Honours 
As Pencaitland

East of Scotland League First Division

 Winners: 1994–95

As Pencaitland & Ormiston

East of Scotland League First Division

 Winners: 2000–01

References

Football clubs in Scotland
Association football clubs established in 1999
1999 establishments in Scotland
East of Scotland Football League teams
Scottish Junior Football Association clubs
Football in East Lothian
Ormiston